The 2009–10 NCAA Division III men's ice hockey season began on October 23, 2009, and concluded on March 20, 2010. This was the 37th season of Division III college ice hockey.

The MASCAC began sponsoring men's ice hockey for the 2009–10 season. Five league members joined with two other schools (who became affiliate members) to form the new conference. Because six of the schools had previously been in ECAC Northeast it caused a realignment within that conference which caused the four Division II schools to formally leave and form Northeast-10's ice hockey division along with two schools from ECAC East. The two teams from ECAC East were members of both conferences from 2009 until 2017 when they left the ECAC East (by then called the New England Hockey Conference).

Regular season

Season tournaments

Standings

Note: Mini-game are not included in final standings

2010 NCAA Tournament

Note: * denotes overtime period(s)

See also
 2009–10 NCAA Division I men's ice hockey season
 2009–10 NCAA Division II men's ice hockey season

References

External links

 
NCAA